Reto Müller may refer to:
 Reto Müller (musicologist)
 Reto Müller (cyclist)